Béla Révész (8 February 1886 – 19 July 1939) was a Hungarian footballer. He played in seven matches for the Hungary national football team between 1909 and 1915.

References

External links
 

1886 births
1939 deaths
Hungarian footballers
Hungary international footballers
Footballers from Budapest
Association football defenders
Olympic footballers of Hungary
Footballers at the 1912 Summer Olympics
MTK Budapest FC players
Hungarian football managers
Hungarian expatriate football managers
Expatriate football managers in Italy
MTK Budapest FC managers
U.S. Triestina Calcio 1918 managers
U.S. Alessandria Calcio 1912 managers